Wapsinonoc Township is a township in Muscatine County, Iowa, in the United States.

History
Wapsinonoc was first settled in 1836.  Wapsinonoc Township is named for Wapsinonoc Creek, a Cedar River tributary that flows through the township.  Wapsinonoc is derived from an Indian name meaning "smooth-surfaced and meandering stream".

References

Townships in Muscatine County, Iowa
Townships in Iowa
1836 establishments in Michigan Territory